An online wallet is a software or web service that allows users to store and control their online shopping information, such as logins, passwords, shipping address and credit card details. It also provides a method for consumers to purchase products from online retailers.

These systems can be integrated with directly or can be combined with operator and credit card payments through a unified mobile web payment platform. Examples include Google Wallet, PayPal, Yandex.Money.

History
English entrepreneur Michael Aldrich invented online shopping in 1979. His system connected a modified domestic TV to a real-time transaction processing computer via a domestic telephone line. He believed that videotex, the modified domestic TV technology with a simple menu-driven human–computer interface, was a 'new, universally applicable, participative communication medium — the first since the invention of the telephone.' This enabled 'closed' corporate information systems to be opened to 'outside' correspondents not just for transaction processing but also for e-messaging and information retrieval and dissemination, later known as e-business. His definition of the new mass communications medium as 'participative' [interactive, many-to-many] was fundamentally different from the traditional definitions of mass communication and mass media and a precursor to the social networking on the Internet 25 years later.

In March 1980 he went on to launch Redifon's Office Revolution, which allowed consumers, customers, agents, distributors, suppliers and service companies to be connected on-line to the corporate systems and allow business transactions to be completed electronically in real-time.

During the 1980s he designed, manufactured, sold, installed, maintained and supported many online shopping systems, using videotex technology. These systems which also provided voice response and handprint processing pre-date the Internet and the World Wide Web, the IBM PC, and Microsoft MS-DOS, and were installed mainly in the UK by large corporations.

The first World Wide Web server and browser, created by Tim Berners-Lee in 1990, opened for commercial use in 1991. Thereafter, subsequent technological innovations emerged in 1994: online banking, the opening of an online pizza shop by Pizza Hut, Netscape's SSL v2 encryption standard for secure data transfer, and Intershop's first online shopping system. Immediately after, Amazon.com launched its online shopping site in 1995 and eBay was also introduced in 1995.

Acceptance as a form of payment
Due to slow adoption and high competition, there is currently no one standard online wallet that is universally accepted.  The acceptance of the online wallet as a form of payment varies based on both individual store policy and the type of online wallet being used.  For example, Google Wallet can be used at MasterCard Paypass locations within the United States.  Conversely, Bitcoin, while accepted internationally, is much less frequently accepted, due in part to its connection to illegal websites like Silk Road (marketplace). Bitcoin can also be held in an online cryptocurrency wallet. It is predicted that in the near future, as the use of online wallets increases, consumer attraction to specific technologies will reduce the number of specific online wallets.

See also
 Electronic money
 Online shopping
 Digital wallet

References 

Payment systems